The Korean Ice Hockey League (KIHL) was the national ice hockey league in South Korea from the 1995–96 season until it folded after the 2003–04 season. Anyang Halla (known as Mando Winia from 1994–1997 and Halla Winia from 1998–2004) won the league title five times.

Winners
 1995–96 Seoktap Construction
 1996–97 Yonsei University
 1997–98 Halla Winia
 1998–99 Yonsei University
 1999–00 Halla Winia
 2000–01 Hyundai Oilbankers
 2001–02 Halla Winia
 2002–03 Halla Winia
 2003–04 Halla Winia

References

Defunct ice hockey leagues in Asia
Ice hockey competitions in South Korea
Defunct sports leagues in South Korea